Broken Wings may refer to:

Music

Albums
 Broken Wings (EP), a 2003 EP by Passerby, now called Flyleaf
 Broken Wings, a 1978 album by Chet Baker

Songs
 "Broken Wings" (1953 song), a song written by John Jerome and Bernard Grun, which was notably recorded by the Stargazers
 "Broken Wings" (Alter Bridge song) (2004)
 "Broken Wings" (Mr. Mister song) (1985)
 "Broken Wings", a song by Bryan Adams from 11 (2008)
 "Broken Wings", a song by Chris de Burgh from Best Moves (1981)
 "Broken Wings", a song by Tomoko Tane as the ending theme for the anime Trinity Blood

Other uses
 Broken Wings (Gibran novel), a 1912 poetic novel by Kahlil Gibran 
 The Broken Wings, a 1962 film adaptation
 Broken Wings (Thwaites novel), a 1934 novel by F.J. Thwaites
 Broken Wings (film), a 2002 Israeli film
 Broken Wings (ballet), a 2016 ballet about Frida Kahlo

See also
 The Broken Wing (disambiguation)